Qingxi is an industrial town located in the southeastern part of Dongguan prefecture-level city, Guangdong Province, China.

Geography
The town is situated in a somewhat mountainous region close to the Pearl River Delta.

History

Qingxi has a deep cultural foundation based in part on its long history of Hakka culture. Qingxi was at first a desolate and uninhabited mountainous place. 800 years ago, during the Hongwu period of the Ming dynasty, Hakka people began moving into Qingxi from the Central Plain. They were touched by the overlapping steep peaks surrounding the place, and the crystal clear stream coming out of the mouth of the Yinping Mountain. Deer drank water from the stream, and the place was given the name Qingxi, also known as Deer City. At first, Hakka people opened up wasteland in the remote mountainous regions where they lived in thatched shacks. Later, they gradually moved to plain areas down the hills. Struggling with nature for hundreds of years, they survived and multiplied until today.

30 years of construction and development after reform and opening-up rapidly transformed Qingxi from a remote village based on agriculture into a modern industrialized town. It has 4 transformer substations of 110 kV supplying 2 billion KW-hours yearly. It has four water works supplying 200,000 tons of water daily. The city boasts modern telecommunication buildings, post offices, public hospitals, schools, cable broadcasting and TV stations, and cultural centers. Recent improvements include Qingxi Forest Park, featuring hiking trails along Qingxi mountain streams up to an 818-meter peak, and Qingxi Culture Park, a mid-town green-space along a stream featuring sports courts, walking paths and footbridges, and carnival rides.

Economy
Economically, Qingxi has specialized in the electronics industry, particularly in high-tech areas such as the manufacture of computer monitors, motherboards, other computer peripherals, and children's products. According to the town's official website, foreign direct investment currently totals over US $2 billion, with some 800 foreign-funded enterprises investing in the area. Notable brands and factories in the town are LiteON, Kenwood & De'Longhi, Omron, Chicony, Phihong, FoxLink, and Ablelink. As of 2009, Qingxi's GDP amounted to 14.9 billion RMB.

Recent additions in the city include several hotels, supermarkets along with many new high-rise apartment buildings.

Transportation

 Daojiao will host 3 Dongguan Rail Transit stations under the current plans for construction of Line 4:

 Qingxinan (Qingxi South
 Qingxi
 Qingxi Coach Terminal

There is a bus service from Qingxi to Shenzhen Bao'an International Airport in Shenzhen.

References

External links
Official Site 

Towns in Guangdong
Geography of Dongguan